Oakland Plantation, also known as the Wade Glover House, is a historic plantation home located near Beech Island, Aiken County, South Carolina.  It was built in 1824–1826, and is a Carolina I-house with minimal mid-19th century and early-20th century additions and alterations. It has a central hall two-over-two floor plan with gable-end chimneys, one-story gallery on the facade, and shed room on the rear elevation.  Also on the property are two contributing outbuildings: a frame one-story gable-end dairy house (c. 1850) and a frame one-story gable-end garage (c. 1920).

It was listed in the National Register of Historic Places in 2011.

References

Houses on the National Register of Historic Places in South Carolina
Houses completed in 1826
Houses in Aiken County, South Carolina
National Register of Historic Places in Aiken County, South Carolina
1826 establishments in South Carolina